Eduardo Portella (Salvador, Bahia, 8 October 1932 – Rio de Janeiro, 2 May 2017) was a Brazilian essayist, author, and Professor Emeritus at the Universidade Federal do Rio de Janeiro. He authored thirty books and was President of UNESCO's general conference.

Portella died of complications from pneumonia on 2 May 2017 at the age of 84.

References

External links
UNESCO
United Nations University

1932 births
2017 deaths
People from Salvador, Bahia
Brazilian writers
Members of the Brazilian Academy of Letters
Academic staff of the Federal University of Rio de Janeiro
Deaths from pneumonia in Rio de Janeiro (state)